Vengeful Creditor is a short story by Chinua Achebe. It was first published in 1972 in Girls at War and Other Stories.  The story describes a wealthy woman who has recently lost her servants due to free education. The book intends to illustrate the social gaps in Nigeria between the lower, middle, and upper classes.

References

1972 short stories
Short stories by Chinua Achebe